Andrey Ivanovich Krasko (10 August 1957, Leningrad, USSR — 4 July 2006, Odessa, Ukraine) was a Russian theatre and cinema actor.

Andrey Krasko first experienced theatrical production as a child at the Theater of Youth Creativity (1969-1974) directed by Matvey Dubrovin.

Son of Russian actor Ivan I. Krasko.

Filmography
 1979 —  Personal Meeting
 1986 —  Breakthrough
 1988 —  Fountain
 1989 —  Stray Dogs
 1989 —  Don César de Bazan
 1991 —  Loch. The Winner of the Water
 1991 —  Afghan Breakdown
 1993 —  The White Horse
 1996 —  Operation Happy New Year
 1997 —  Brother 
 1998 —  Peculiarities of the National Fishing
 1998 —  Checkpoint
 1998 —   National Security Agent (TV)
 2000 —  Peculiarities of the National Hunt in Winter Season
 2001 —  Sisters 
 2002 —  Tycoon 
 2003 —  Lines of Fate
 2004 —  72 Meters
 2004 —  Goddess: How I fell in Love
 2005 —  Brezhnev
 2005 —  The Fall of the Empire (TV)
 2005 —  Yesenin (TV)
 2005 —  The 9th Company
 2005 —  Dead Man's Bluff
 2005 —  Graveyard Shift
 2005 —  Doctor Zhivago
 2005 —  The Turkish Gambit
 2006 —  The Orange Sky
 2006 —  Piter FM
 2006 —  Bastards
 2006 —   U.E. 
 2007 —  Liquidation 
 2007 —  I’m Staying

References

External links
 

1957 births
2006 deaths
Russian male actors
Soviet male film actors
Russian television presenters
Russian people of Ukrainian descent
Filmed deaths from natural causes
Russian State Institute of Performing Arts alumni
Male actors from Saint Petersburg